Jacques de Chavigny (7 January 1880- 4 May 1963) was a French naturalist  who specialised in ornithology and oology. He was, from 1929, on the editorial committee  of Alauda, Revue internationale d'Ornithologie :fr:Alauda, Revue internationale d'Ornithologie with its founder Paul Paris and Louis Lavauden, Noël Mayaud, Henri Heim de Balsac, Henri Jouard, Jacques Delamain and  Paul Poty.

References
René Ronsil (1948) Bibliographie ornithologique française. Tome I. Bibliographie. Paul Lechevalier, Paris, 534 p.

French ornithologists
1963 deaths
1880 births
20th-century French zoologists